Walter Hamilton Clarkson (November 3, 1878 – October 10, 1946) was a pitcher in Major League Baseball. He played for the New York Highlanders from 1904 to 1907 and the Cleveland Naps from 1907 to 1908.

Clarkson attended Harvard University, where he played college baseball for the Crimson from 1898 to 1903.

References

External links

1878 births
1946 deaths
Major League Baseball pitchers
New York Highlanders players
Cleveland Naps players
Jersey City Skeeters players
Army Black Knights baseball coaches
Harvard Crimson baseball players
Sportspeople from Cambridge, Massachusetts
Baseball players from Massachusetts